Asaphodes sericodes is a moth in the family Geometridae. It is endemic to New Zealand and has been observed in the southern parts of the South Island. This species inhabits open tussock grasslands in subalpine scrub or wetlands. The female of the species is likely semi-apterous and is flightless. The adult males are on the wing in January.

Taxonomy
This species was first described by Edward Meyrick in 1915, using specimens collected by George Hudson at Mount Earnslaw at 4000 ft in January, and named Xanthorhoe sericodes. George Hudson discussed and illustrated this species under that name in 1928. In 1939 Louis Beethoven Prout placed this species in the genus Larentia. This placement was not accepted by New Zealand taxonomists. In 1971 J. S. Dugdale placed this species in the genus Asaphodes. In 1988 Dugdale confirmed this placement. The male lectotype specimen, collected at Mount Earnslaw, is held at the Natural History Museum, London.

Description 

Meyrick described this species as follows:
 
It is likely that the female of this species is narrow and short winged with long legs and is incapable of flight, as is the case with the close relatives of this species.

Distribution 
This species is endemic to New Zealand. Other than the type locality it has also been observed in Symmetry Peaks in the Eyre Mountains.

Habitat
This species inhabits tussock grassland openings in subalpine bush as well as wetland tussock habitat.

Behaviour 
Adults of this species is on the wing in January.

References 

Moths described in 1915
Moths of New Zealand
Larentiinae
Endemic fauna of New Zealand
Taxa named by Edward Meyrick
Endemic moths of New Zealand